"Souvenir" is a song written by Paul Humphreys and Martin Cooper of English electronic band Orchestral Manoeuvres in the Dark (OMD), and released as the first single from the group's 1981 album Architecture & Morality. Sung by Humphreys, the track is characterised by its use of slowed-down choral loops, and showcases OMD's early approach of utilising a synthesizer hook in place of a vocal chorus. The song has garnered praise from critics and fellow artists.

"Souvenir" became an international hit for the band. Peaking at number 3 on the UK Singles Chart, it remains the group's highest-charting single in their home country, along with 1991's "Sailing on the Seven Seas". The song also reached the Top 10 in several European countries, including topping the charts in Spain and Portugal.

History
A tape consisting of slowed-down loops of a choir tuning up lent by ex-OMD member Dave Hughes had been the initial inspiration for the song. The composition was difficult, and the group was initially tempted to abandon the track. It was originally titled "The Choir Song" and the working title remained up until the final week for Peter Saville's artwork delivery.

Keyboard player Paul Humphreys provided lead vocals and had co-written the song with Martin Cooper who had played live with OMD and was becoming part of the group. A synthesizer hook substitutes for a vocal chorus, as with other OMD compositions. Frontman and co-founder Andy McCluskey was not a fan of the track. He said in 1987, "I think you can always make a better case for a song you've written on your own... But everyone seems to think I hated 'Souvenir' just because it was Paul's song – not so. I genuinely thought it was a bit soppy, and since I hadn't written it, I found it hard to relate to."

An extended version of Souvenir (with an additional verse) was released as a 10" single and was later included as a bonus on the digitally remastered copies of Architecture & Morality. It was the second time the group had used this unusual release format, the first being the 10" single for "Messages" in May 1980.

Unlike successive hit singles "Joan of Arc" and "Maid of Orleans" from the Architecture & Morality album, "Souvenir" has never been reissued as a standalone CD single release.

The title of the track was used for a documentary DVD about the reformed OMD, released in 2007 by Aspect Television.

Reception
Cashbox named "Souvenir", and "Did It in a Minute" by Hall & Oates, as their top "singles picks" for the week of 20 March 1982. The magazine called "Souvenir" an "insidiously catchy and melodic synthesizer glissando", and OMD's "strongest U.S. bid yet". Sunie Fletcher of Record Mirror described the track as a "pleasant slowie" that is "very reminiscent of French movie music", while the Vancouver Suns Neal Hall said it "underscores the band's talent at writing subtle, intelligent pop songs". Peter Silverton of Smash Hits was less enthused, portraying the track as "ethereal but rather hollow". The magazine later expressed an alternate view, observing a "strong" single that features 1981's "intro of the year".

"Souvenir" entered the UK Singles Chart on 25 August 1981 at no. 41, reaching no. 23 the following week. It was featured for the first time on Top of the Pops two days later, helping the single to enter the Top 10 the next week, and then reach its peak of no. 3 on 15 September. "Souvenir" was the 28th best-selling single in the UK in 1981.

Retrospectively, Ned Raggett of AllMusic praised Humphreys' "warm and beautiful lead role" and described the mid-song instrumental break as "especially inspired". Classic Pops Mark Lindores called it a "shimmering synth-pop masterpiece", while Trouser Press hailed the track as "magnificent" and "one of the most majestic singles of the post-punk era". Music Week identified "Souvenir" as a "choral classic" and one of "the world's greatest songs".

Legacy
In Record Mirror, critics Alf Martin and Daniela Soave each listed "Souvenir" as one of the 10 best singles of 1981; Smash Hits readers placed it fourth. Classic Pop later ranked the single as the 34th-greatest of the 1980s. Having gained limited mainstream airplay since its initial chart success, "Souvenir" was mentioned in the IPC Media special 501 Lost Songs as a "classic piece of early '80s melancholy". It has nevertheless been featured on numerous 1980s compilation albums, as well as in the BBC drama Ashes to Ashes.

Multiple artists have endorsed the track. In a 1981 interview with BBC Radio 1, Godley & Creme named OMD's "Souvenir" and "Enola Gay" as two of their favourite singles. Upon meeting in 1981, Pet Shop Boys members Neil Tennant and Chris Lowe found common ground in their love of the track. Tennant wrote in 2018, "'Souvenir' is such a beautiful and wistful song with that sparse early Eighties electronic sound. I still play it." Neil Hannon of The Divine Comedy professed to "absolutely adore" the single, which he purchased as a child. He added, "[It's] probably the single record that I have played most in my life. I just kept it on repeat." The Charlatans frontman Tim Burgess, who also bought the single, described it as "so atmospheric" and an "absolute classic".

In 2011, Princess Chelsea named "Souvenir" her favourite song. Jonn Penney of Ned's Atomic Dustbin selected it as the one track he would like to be played at his funeral, adding, "I'd want people to have that euphoric feeling that you sometimes get, when you remember something special that happened to you. This song somehow captures that for me." Erasure vocalist Andy Bell said that he is always moved to tears upon hearing the track, while Arcade Fire orchestrator Owen Pallett, who has arranged string versions of OMD songs, said, "I was working so hard to make the strings sound like a four-pole filter sweep, which is what is the intro of 'Souvenir' is made from. That inspired me to... apply it to my own songs."

B-sides
There are two songs on the B-sides of the 7" and the 10" singles, "Motion & Heart" (Amazon Version) and "Sacred Heart". The original version of "Motion & Heart" can be found on the Organisation album. The Amazon Version was recorded at Amazon Studios in Kirkby as a possible single after "Enola Gay", but that plan was dropped. Both songs are produced by OMD and can be found on the remastered re-issues of Architecture & Morality. "Sacred Heart" is also included on Navigation: The OMD B-Sides.

"Sacred Heart" was sampled by German musician Console for his instrumental piece "Crabcraft", which appeared on the album Rocket in the Pocket (1998). Icelandic singer Björk later added a vocal to the track, retitling it "Heirloom", and including it on the album Vespertine (2001).

Music video

The song's promo video was filmed by Peter Saville in the grounds of Stowe House (the home of Stowe School, in Buckinghamshire, England) and Blenheim Palace Park, in Oxfordshire. It was an early MTV favourite and is among OMD's more well-known videos.

Andy McCluskey is seen driving around in a classic red, convertible Volkswagen Karmann Ghia (property of Peter Saville), while Paul Humphreys stands on, and leans against the pillars of, the Palladian Bridge while singing. The promo video is included on the video version of The Best of OMD, the bonus DVD of the 2007 reissue of Architecture & Morality and the DVD included in the 2008 Compilation album Messages: Greatest Hits.

Live performances
The song was performed at live shows on a regular basis following the Architecture & Morality tour in 1981, except for when Paul Humphreys was no longer with the band during the 1990s and early 2000s. A live performance from 1981 was filmed for the Live at The Theatre Royal, Drury Lane concert in December 1981, initially released on VHS (1982) and laserdisc (1984) and later on DVD.

The song was also performed with The Royal Liverpool Philharmonic Orchestra in June 2009 as documented by the Electricity DVD release.

On 26 July 2015 Paul Humphreys was unable to perform at the 80s Rewind Festival in Scotland and so the vocal was sung for the first time by Andy McCluskey. On seeing a clip of the performance from his hospital bed Humphreys said he felt he had "entered some kind of alternative universe".

Sleeve design
The sleeve was designed by Peter Saville and Brett Wickens. The 7" sleeve has a die-cut hole in the middle, revealing the label. On the label is a picture of a Düsseldorf street scene. For the 10" this picture is printed on the sleeve. It was the first single released with OMD as the band name. The European releases have different artwork, some almost identical to the UK releases. A Canadian release of the 10" has green transparent vinyl.

Alternate versions
In May 1991 DMC released a 12" vinyl single with the "Postcards from the Edge Mix" by Brothers in Rhythm.

In 1998 four remixes of the song were made by Moby for the intended second disc of The OMD Singles. The second disc was dropped, but the remixes appeared on various The OMD Remixes EPs. In 2003 the double disc version was released in France only, which included all four remixes.

Joyce Manor, Mike "μ-Ziq" Paradinas, and Mark Morriss of the Bluetones, are among those to have covered the song.

Track listings

 7" single - UK DinDisc DIN 24
Sceneside A:
 "Souvenir" (Paul Humphreys, Martin Cooper) – 3:39
Typeside B:
 "Motion & Heart" (Amazon Version) (P. Humphreys, Andy McCluskey) – 3:07
 "Sacred Heart" (P. Humphreys, A. McCluskey) – 3:30

 10" single - UK DinDisc DIN 24-10
A-side :
 "Extended Souvenir" – 4:16
B-side :
 "Motion & Heart" (Amazon Version) – 3:07
 "Sacred Heart" – 3:30

Charts

Weekly charts

Year-end charts

Certifications

References

External links
 
 
 

1981 singles
Orchestral Manoeuvres in the Dark songs
Songs written by Paul Humphreys
Song recordings produced by Mike Howlett
1981 songs